Limonka - newspaper of direct action is a Moscow-based newspaper. Limonka was  the official organ of the National Bolshevik Party until it was banned in 2007; since 2010 it has been the official organ of The Other Russia. The name is a play of words on the party's founder surname Limonov and idiomatic Russian for grenade. The organization was banned in 2002.

History

Limonka was founded by Eduard Limonov and it was first published in 1994. On July 26, 2002 it was banned by The Khamovnichesky Court of Moscow for "promoting extremism and calling on overthrowing the constitutional order". 
Federal Agency on Press accused the newspaper of abuse of freedom of the press and violation of Article 4 of the Law "On Mass Media", pointing out that the publications in Limonka are aimed at inciting of social intolerance and discord and contain calls for the forcible seizure of power and propaganda of war.

Oleg Mironov, Ombudsman in Russia, in his report for 2002, substantiated the liquidation of the newspapers Limonka and Russian Host as "a series of steps to curb the propaganda of ethnic hatred".

Since then, Limonka was printed under title General Line. After banned of the newspaper General Line in 2006, Limonka was published as On the edge, and for a 2007 as Trudodni. Number 319 for July, 2007 came out under the logo of Other Russia.

In all cases the title Limonka was printed in large letters under new titles (General Line, On the edge, Trudodni) in a smaller font, along with the note that the paper hasn't come out since September 20, 2002 (but retained continuous numbering of newspaper Limonka).

Starting from the number 327 the newspaper ceased printing paper version and began to spread in the network in the form of pdf files.

Content
Limonka is stylized into punk zine. The newspaper contains articles on radical politics, counterculture and "acute" social issues. The newspaper also publishes reports from street protests and direct actions.

Books
 Поколение Лимонки (Generation of Limonka), Ultra.Kultura, 2005  - book of short stories by a young Russian authors published in Limonka
 Окопная правда Чеченской войны (Truth of the trenches of Chechen War), Yauza-Press, Moscow, 2007 - collection of articles about War in Chechnya that were published in the newspaper Limonka
 Лимонка в тюрьму (Limonka to a prison), Centrpoligraf, Moscow, 2012  - memories of national-bolsheviks - political prisoners

Contributors

Regular
 Eduard Limonov - founder and editor
 Sergei Aksenov
 Aleksandr Averin
 Andrei Dmitriev
 Aleksandr Dugin
 Vladimir Linderman
 Natalya Medvedeva
 Zakhar Prilepin
 Aleksandr Lebedev-Frontov - graphic layout

Occasional
 Oleg Kashin
 Roman Konoplev
 Misha Verbitsky

See also
 Freedom of the press in the Russian Federation
 National Bolshevism

Further reading
Fabrizio Fenghi, Making post-Soviet counterpublics: the aesthetics of Limonka and the National-Bolshevik Party

References

External links
 Limonkas official website
 Limonka archive
 Limonka – poetry
 National Bolshevik Party

National Bolshevism
Russian-language newspapers published in Russia
Newspapers published in Moscow
Alternative press
Banned newspapers
Publications established in 1994
Eduard Limonov